Events from the year 1541 in art.

Events
 Michelangelo completes his fresco The Last Judgment on the altar wall of the Sistine Chapel in Vatican City.
 Cardinal Alexander writes to Bishop Marco Vigerio discussing frescoes to be done by Michelangelo for the Cappella Paolina.

Works

 Battista Franco Veneziano paints fresco of the Arrest of John the Baptist for the Oratory of San Giovanni Decollato
 Pietro Negroni paints Adoration of Magi
 Titian – The Marquis of Vasto addressing his troops
Antoine Caron – Dionysius Areopagite and the Eclipse of Sun(image)

Births
date unknown 
 El Greco (or Domenikos Theotokopoulos),  painter, sculptor, and architect of the Spanish Renaissance (died 1614)
 Aert Mijtens, Flemish Renaissance painter (died 1602)
 Yi Chong, Korean painter (died 1622)

Deaths
January 6 - Bernard van Orley, Flemish Northern Renaissance painter and draughtsman (born 1487-1491)
August - Valentin Bousch, glass painter (born 1490)
date unknown
Jean Clouet, miniaturist and painter who worked in France during the Renaissance (born 1480)
Gerard Horenbout, Flemish miniaturist (born 1465)
Stanisław Samostrzelnik, Polish Renaissance painter and Cistercian monk (born 1490)

 
Years of the 16th century in art